Manasses or Manasseh (Mənaše) is a biblical Hebrew name for men. It is the given name of seven people of the Bible, the name of a tribe of Israel, and the name of one of the apocryphal writings. The name is also used in the modern world.

Biblical individuals

Son of Joseph
Manasses was the eldest son of Joseph and the Egyptian Asenath (Genesis 41:50-51; 46:20). The name means "he that causes to forget"; Joseph assigned the reason for its bestowal: "God hath made me to forget all my toils, and my father's house" (Genesis 41:51). Jacob blessed Manasses (Genesis 48); but gave preference to the younger son Ephraim, despite the father's protestations in favour of Manasses. By this blessing, Jacob put Manasses and Ephraim in the same class with Ruben and Simeon (verses 3-5), and gave foundation for the admission of the tribes of Manasses and Ephraim.

Husband of Judith
Manasses, Judith's husband, died of sunstroke in Bethulia (Judith 8:2-3).

Story of Ahikar
Manasses was a character in the Story of Ahikar (not in Vulgata, but in Septuagint) told by Tobit on the point of death. The Vatican Manuscript mentions Manasses (Manassês) as one "who gave alms and escaped the snare of death". The Sinaitic Manuscript mentions no one, but clearly refers the almsgiving and escape to Achiacharus (Ahikar). The reading of the Vatican Manuscript may be an error.

Sons of Ezra's companions
Manasses was a son of Bani, one of the companions of Esdras who married foreign wives (Ezra 10:30).

Another Manasses was the son of Hasom, another of the same companions of Esdras (Ezra 10:33).

Ancestor of Jonathan
Manasses (according to k’thibh of Massoretic Text and Septuagint) was ancestor of Jonathan, a priest of the tribe of Dan (Judges 18:30). The Vulgate and k’ri of the Massoretic Text give Moses, the correct reading.

King of Judah
Manasseh was the thirteenth King of Judah, and son and successor to Hezekiah (2 Kings 20:21 sq.).

Other notable people
Notable people bearing the regnal, religious, or given name Manasses, Manasseh or Menashe include:

 Manasseh (High Priest), Jewish High Priest, c. 245–240 BC
 Manasseh was the regnal name of two Khazar rulers of the Bulanids:
 Manasseh I, mid to late 9th century
 Manasseh II, late 9th century
 Manasses de Ramerupt (died after 1031), French noble
 Manasses II, Count of Rethel (died 1032), French noble
 Manasses, Count of Dammartin (died 1037), French noble
 Manasses III, Count of Rethel (1022–1065), French noble
 Manasses I (archbishop of Reims), French archbishop
 Manasses II (archbishop of Reims) (died 1106), French archbishop, 1096–1106
 Manasses of Hierges, French crusader and constable of the Kingdom of Jerusalem
 Constantine Manasses (c.1130–c.1187), Byzantine historian
 Manassès II de Pougy (c.1130–1190), French bishop of Troyes, 1181–1190
 Manasses IV, Count of Rethel (died 1199), French noble
 Manasses V, Count of Rethel (died 1272), French noble
 Isaac Manasses de Pas, Marquis de Feuquieres (1590–1640), French soldier
 Menasseh Ben Israel (1604–1657), Portuguese Rabbi and publisher
 Manasseh Cutler (representative) (1742–1823), American clergyman and politician
 Manasseh Dawes (died 1829), English barrister and writer
 Manasseh Masseh Lopes (1755–1831), British politician
'Manasse ǃNoreseb (1840–1905), tribal chief in Namibia
 Manasseh Meyer (1843–1930), British businessman and philanthropist
 Menashe Skulnik (1890–1970), Jewish American actor
 Aaron Manasses McMillan (1895–1980), American doctor and politician 
 Menassa Youhanna (1899–1930), Egyptian Coptic priest and historian
 Menashe Oppenheim (1905–73), Polish Jewish singer, composer, and songwriter
 Manasse Herbst (1913–1997), Hungarian German-speaking actor and singer
 Menashe Klein (1924–2011), Czech-American Hasidic Rebbe and posek
 Manasses Kuria (1929–2005), Kenyan Anglican Archbishop
 Menashe Kadishman (1932–2015), Israeli sculptor and painter
 Menashe Amir (born 1940), Iranian broadcaster and Israel expert
 Manasseh Sogavare (born 1955), Prime Minister of the Solomon Islands
 Manassé Nzobonimpa (born 1957), Burundian politician
 Manasseh Maelanga (born 1970), Solomon Islander politician
 Menashe Mashiah (born 1973), Israeli football referee
 Manasseh Ishiaku (born 1983), Nigerian footballer
 Manassé Enza-Yamissi (born 1989), Central African football player
 Menasheh Idafar (born 1991), British and Bahraini racing driver
 Manasseh Garner (born 1992), American football player 
 Manasseh Lomole Waya, South Sudanese politician
 Manasse Mbonye, Rwandan astrophysicist

See also
 Manasse (surname)
 Menashe (surname)

Notes

References

Hebrew masculine given names
Book of Genesis people
Set index articles on Hebrew Bible people